Luis Felipe Negrón Fernández (April 29, 1910 - December 1, 1986) was a Puerto Rican jurist who served as Associate Judge of the Supreme Court of Puerto Rico and later as Chief Justice of the Supreme Court of Puerto Rico from 1971 till 1972.

He was born in Cataño, Puerto Rico on April 29, 1910. In 1934 he graduated in Law from the University of Puerto Rico School of Law and soon after devoted himself to public service. He was head of the Legal Division of the State Insurance Fund (1935-38), District Attorney in Humacao (1938-40), Assistant Prosecutor of the Supreme Court of Puerto Rico (1940-45) and Attorney General of Puerto Rico (1947-48). In 1948 President Harry S. Truman appointed him Associate Judge of the Supreme Court of Puerto Rico and in 1957 he became position of Chief Justice, appointed by Governor Luis Muñoz Marín. Soon after his retirement in 1971, he was appointed for the second time to hold the position of Chief Justice by governor Luis A. Ferre; occupied it until 1972 when he resigned the position. 

Luis Negrón Fernández died December 1, 1986, in Río Piedras, Puerto Rico, at age 76.

His son Antonio Negrón García also served Associate Judge of the Supreme Court of Puerto Rico from 1974 to 2000.

Sources 

La Justicia en sus Manos by Luis Rafael Rivera, 

|-

|-

|-

1910 births
1986 deaths
Chief Justices of the Supreme Court of Puerto Rico
People from Cataño, Puerto Rico
Puerto Rican judges
University of Puerto Rico alumni
20th-century American judges